
Gmina Lubsza is a rural gmina (administrative district) in Brzeg County, Opole Voivodeship, in south-western Poland.

The gmina contains part of the protected area called Stobrawa Landscape Park.

Villages
Gmina Lubsza contains the villages and settlements of Błota, Borek, Borucice, Boruta, Czepielowice, Dobrzyń, Garbów, Kopalina, Kościerzyce, Książkowice, Lednica, Leśna Woda, Lubicz, Lubsza, Mąkoszyce, Michałowice, Myśliborzyce, Nowe Kolnie, Nowy Świat, Piastowice, Pisarzowice, Raciszów, Rogalice, Roszkowice, Śmiechowice, Stawy, Szydłowice, Tarnowiec, Zamcze and Złotówka.

Neighbouring gminas
Gmina Lubsza is bordered by the town of Brzeg and by the gminas of Jelcz-Laskowice, Namysłów, Oława, Popielów, Skarbimierz and Świerczów.

References

Lubsza
Brzeg County